A list of notable Polish politicians of the right-wing League of Polish Families party.

A
 Filip Adwent
 Przemysław Andrejuk

B
 Witold Bałażak
 Ryszard Bender
 Krzysztof Bosak

C
 Sylwester Chruszcz
 Edward Ciągło

D
 Marian Daszyk
 Janusz Dobrosz

F
 Piotr Farfał
 Andrzej Fedorowicz

G
 Maciej Giertych
 Roman Giertych
 Dariusz Grabowski

H
 Witold Hatka

J
 Gabriel Janowski
 Jan Jarota

K
 Marek Kawa
 Marek Kotlinowski
 Bogusław Kowalski
 Janusz Kołodziej
 Urszula Krupa
 Jacek Kurski

L
 Henryk Lewczuk

M
 Antoni Macierewicz
 Arnold Masin
 Gabriela Masłowska
 Andrzej Mańka
 Halina Murias
 Leszek Murzyn

O
 Mirosław Orzechowski
 Edward Ośko

P
 Radosław Parda
 Daniel Pawłowiec
 Mirosław Piotrowski
 Bogdan Pęk

R
 Elżbieta Ratajczak
 Bogusław Rogalski

S
 Bogusław Sobczak
 Anna Sobecka
 Antoni Sosnowski
 Ewa Sowińska
 Robert Strąk

T
 Witold Tomczak

W
 Rafał Wiechecki
 Wojciech Wierzejski
 Robert Winnicki 
 Zygmunt Wrzodak

Z
 Stanisław Zadora

Ś
 Piotr Ślusarczyk

See also

  

 
Conservatism-related lists
Lists of Polish politicians by party